Acrolepia prasinaula is a moth of the  family Acrolepiidae. It was described by Edward Meyrick in 1927. It is found in Colombia.

References

Moths described in 1927
Acrolepiidae